Storace is a surname. Notable people with the surname include:

 Bernardo Storace ( 1664), Italian composer
 Francesco Storace (born 1959), Italian politician
 Guillermo Storace (born 1974), a forward of the Uruguay national rugby union team
 Marc Storace (born 1951), Maltese rock vocalist (lives in Switzerland)
 Nancy Storace (1765–1817), operatic singer
 Patricia Storace, American poet and essayist
 Stephen Storace (1762–1796), English composer